This is a list of songs written by Nickolas Ashford and Valerie Simpson.

Chart hits and other notable songs written by Nickolas Ashford and Valerie Simpson

References

Ashford and Simpson
American rhythm and blues songs